KCYA (97.7 FM) is a radio station licensed to Rolling Hills, Wyoming, United States. The station is currently owned by Cochise Media Licenses LLC.

References

External links

CYA